Theophrastoideae is a small subfamily of flowering plants in the family Primulaceae. It was formerly recognized as a separate family Theophrastaceae. As previously circumscribed, the family consisted of eight genera and 95 species of trees or shrubs, native to tropical regions of the Americas.

Description 

The two subclades or tribes of Theophrastoideae, Theophrasteae (Theophrastaceae s.s.) and Samoleae, share only the presence of staminodes. The species of Samolus are perennial, herbaceous or suffrutescent (shrubby) and characterised by perigynous flowers. The remaining genera (Theophrastaceae s.s.) are  generally evergreen shrubs or small trees, with hypogynous flowers.

Taxonomy

History 

Linnaeus, in formally describing the genera, placed Theophrasta and related genera in a group he named Pentandria Monogynia (i.e 5 stamens, one pistil), his system being based on sexual characteristics. Jussieu arranged Linnaeus' genera in a hierarchical system of ranks based on the relative value of a much wider range of characteristics. In his Genera plantarum (1789) he organised the primuloid genera into two Ordo (families), within a class (VIII) he called Dicotyledones Monopetalae Corolla Hypogyna, based on the cotyledons (two), form of the petals (fused), and position of the corolla with respect to the ovary (below).  Jussieu's families were the Lysimachiae, including Primula and Theophrasta and the Sapotae, including Myrsine, these being the three main lineages in modern understanding of the Primulaceae.

Don described a family of Theophrasteaceae in 1836, with four genera, Theophrasta, Clavija, Jacquinia and Leonia, of which the latter was determined unrelated, and placed this family as closely related to Myrsineae and Sapoteae. Later, De Candolle more formally described a family, Theophrastaceae, based on the genus Theophrasta, in 1844, with six genera, Theophrasta, Clavija, Jacquinia, Oncinus, Monotheca and Reptonia. The latter three are no longer considered related.

Theophrastaceae were included in the order Primulales by Cronquist (1988). The APG system (1998) submerged that order in an enlarged order Ericales (Ericales s.l.), a basal group in the asterids, where the families of Primulales formed a monophyletic primuloid clade. Subsequent molecular phylogenetic analysis showed that the genus Samolus (brook weeds), with about 12–15 additional species and traditionally placed within Primulaceae, as tribe Samoleae, was more closely related to the Theophrastaceae and suggested its transfer. Briefly Samolus was considered a separate family, Samolaceae. The third revision of the APG, APG III (2009) realigned all the primuloid families within a greatly enlarged Primulaceae (Primulaceae s.l.), in which each of the existing families became a subfamily. The newly described Theophrastoideae included Samolus, vastly increasing the area of distribution.

Phylogeny 

The cladogram below shows the infrafamilial phylogenetic relationships of Primulaceae, together with the subfamilial crown ages. Maesoideae forms the basal group, while Primuloideae and Myrsinoideae are in a sister group relationship.

Subdivision 

The phylogenetic relationships of the 8 accepted genera are shown in the cladogram, in which Samolus forms the basal group and is sister to all other Theophrastoideae (Theophrastaceae s.s.), the remaining genera forming two subclades. Alternatively these two subclasses have been designated as two tribes, Samoleae and Theophrasteae:

The Theophrasteae consist of seven genera and about 100 species, while Samoleae has only the single genus Samolus, with about 12–15 dozen species. In 1903, Theophrastaceae consisted of four genera, Clavija, Jacquinia, Deherainia, and Theophrasta. In 1904, a species of Deherainia was segregated to form the novel genus Neomezia, to create five genera and in 1993 a species of Jacquinia was segregated to form a sixth genus, Votschia. Molecular phylogenetic analyses revealed that Jacquinia was still paraphyletic consisting of two separate and distinct clades, necessitating splitting off another new genus, Bonellia, to make seven genera in total in this tribe.

Etymology 

Theophrastoideae takes its name from the nominative and type genus, Theophrasta, named by Linnaeus after the Ancient Greek philosopher and biologist  Theophrastus.

Botanical authority 

The botanical authority for the previous family, Theophrastaceae, belongs to David Don (D.Don) for his first description of the family in 1835. The subsequently submerged subfamily bears the authority of Alphonse de Candolle (A.DC.) for his formal conspectus of Theophrastaceae in 1844. The authority for the tribe Theophrasteae is that of Bartling who used the term Theophrastea to describe a grouping of genera, including Theophrasta within the family Ardisiaceae in 1830. This represents the earliest creation of a suprageneric taxon for these genera. The Ardisiaceae were later included in the other primuloid family, Myrsinaceae (Myrsinoideae).

Distribution and habitat

Distribution 

The species of Theophrasteae are largely neotropical, confined to Mesoamerica, Central and South America and the Caribbean.

In contrast Samolus species are mainly restricted to different continents in the Southern Hemisphere with about 4–6 species restricted to North America. However the generic type, Samolus valerandi  is near cosmopolitan in its distribution.

Habitat 

Theophrastaceae s.s. are mainly found in lowland regions which have a seasonal, dry climate, and prefer coastal thickets, dry shrub vegetation, or dry deciduous or semideciduous forests. However a number of species of Clavija are found in low montane and lowland rain forests.

Unlike much of the traditional Theophrastoideae, Samolus  is found in either flooded areas around rivers and lakes, or in salt marshes.

References

Bibliography

Books 
 
  (also available online at Gallica)
  
 
 
 , in

Articles

Samolus

APG

Websites 
 
  (see also Angiosperm Phylogeny Website)
 , in 
 , in 
 
 
 , in

External links 

 
Primulaceae
Asterid subfamilies